Muhammad Masum Aziz (1952 – 17 October 2022) was a Bangladeshi stage, film and television actor. He played in more than four hundred dramas and films since 1985. He won Bangladesh National Film Award for Best Supporting Actor for his performance in the film Ghani (2011) and in 2022, he was awarded the Ekushey Padak for his contribution to acting by the government of Bangladesh.

Career
While studying in University of Chittagong, Aziz made his acting debut in theater. In 1985, he debuted in television dramas. He worked at Dhaka Padatik, a theatre troupe, as both actor and director for several years. His last stage direction was "Trial of Surya Sen".

Aziz served as the vice-president of the Director's Guild, a group of television drama directors.

Works
Films

Television dramas
 Ure Jai Bok Pokkhi
 24 Carat Men
 Tin Gadha
 Priyo Protipakkha
 Josna Korechhe Aari
 Sakin Sarisuri

References

External links
 

1952 births
2022 deaths
People from Pabna District
University of Chittagong alumni
Bangladeshi male film actors
Bangladeshi male stage actors
Bangladeshi male television actors
Best Supporting Actor National Film Award (Bangladesh) winners
Recipients of the Ekushey Padak
Date of birth missing